CESS may refer to:
Central Eurasian Studies Society, a North American–based society for scholars concerned with the Central Eurasian region
Centre for Earth Science Studies, an autonomous research centre to promote and establish scientific and technological research and development studies in the earth sciences, in Thiruvananthapuram, Kerala, India
Centre for Economic and Social Studies, Hyderabad
Education cess, in India, a tax earmarked to promote education.
Cess, a tax